Sir Thomas Burdett, 1st Baronet (14 September 1668 – 14 April 1727) was an Irish politician and baronet.

Born at Garrahill in County Carlow, he was the son of Thomas Burdett and his wife Catherine Kennedy, daughter of Sir Robert Kennedy, 1st Baronet. Burdett was educated at Kilkenny College and Trinity College, Dublin and served as High Sheriff of Carlow in 1701.

Burdett entered the Irish House of Commons in 1704, sitting for Carlow County to 1713. Subsequently he was Member of Parliament (MP) for Carlow Borough until 1715 and then again for Carlow County until his death in 1727. On 11 July 1723, Burdett was created a baronet, of Dunmore, in the County of Carlow, with a special remainder to the heirs of his sister Anne, wife of Walter Weldon, who sat also in the Parliament of Ireland. In 1725, he was appointed Governor of County Carlow, a post he held for the next two years.

He married firstly the twice-widowed Honora Boyle, daughter of Michael Boyle, Lord Chancellor of Ireland and Archbishop of Armagh and his second wife Mary O'Brien, in 1700. She died ten years later and Burdett remarried Martha Vigors, daughter of Bartholomew Vigors, Bishop of Ferns and Leighlin and Martha Neale, in 1715. He died, aged 58 and was succeeded by his only son, William, by his second wife.

References

1668 births
1727 deaths
Politicians from County Carlow
People educated at Kilkenny College
Alumni of Trinity College Dublin
Baronets in the Baronetage of Ireland
Irish MPs 1703–1713
Irish MPs 1713–1714
Irish MPs 1715–1727
Members of the Parliament of Ireland (pre-1801) for County Carlow constituencies
High Sheriffs of Carlow